Walter Frederick Ferrier (1865–1950) was a Canadian geologist and mining engineer.

He graduated from McGill University's school of mining engineering. He was a tireless mineral collector and was known for walking straight into mining offices to request specimens. Consequently, he created large collections of mineral specimens of a quality still admired to this day. Many classic specimens would never be in collections had it not been for his effort and skill. 
The mineral specimens he amassed were instrumental in creating the mineral collections of the Smithsonian in Washington DC, the Royal Ontario Museum in Toronto, Ontario, Canada, University of Alberta, and the museum particularly dear to his heart, the Redpath Museum at McGill University in Montreal, Quebec, Canada.

During one of his collecting trips he noticed a bladed mineral enclosed in chalcedony on the edge of Kamloops Lake in the Kamloops Mining Division, British Columbia, Canada. It turned out to be a new member of the Zeolite family of minerals. Subsequently, it was named after him - Ferrierite. The type material of this mineral is stored at the Redpath Museum and is part of a separate collection that also bears his name.

References

 L.S. Stevenson, "Walter F. Ferrier and the Ferrier Mineral Collections", Mineralogical Record, Volume Three, Number Five: September–October 1972, p. 232 ff.

1865 births
1950 deaths
Canadian geologists
Canadian mineralogists
Canadian mining engineers
Royal Ontario Museum
McGill University Faculty of Engineering alumni